Senator Fitzgerald may refer to:

Members of the United States Senate
Peter Fitzgerald (politician) (born 1960), U.S. Senator from Illinois
Thomas Fitzgerald (American politician) (1796–1855), U.S. Senator from Michigan.

United States state senate members
James F. Fitzgerald (1895–1975), New York State Senate
James Fitzgerald (American jurist, born 1851) (1851–1922), New York State Senate
John C. Fitzgerald (1863–1928), New York State Senate
John F. Fitzgerald (1863–1950), Massachusetts State Senate
John I. Fitzgerald (1882–1966), Massachusetts State Senate
John Warner Fitzgerald (1924–2006), Michigan State Senate
Scott L. Fitzgerald (born 1963), Wisconsin State Senate
Steve Fitzgerald (born 1944), Kansas State Senate
W. T. A. Fitzgerald (1871–1948), Massachusetts State Senate
William B. Fitzgerald Jr. (1942–2008), Michigan State Senate
William J. Fitzgerald (1887–1947), Connecticut State Senate

See also
Joan Fitz-Gerald (born 1948), Colorado State Senate